Odisha University of Agriculture and Technology (OUAT) was established in Bhubaneswar, Odisha, India in 1962. It is the second oldest agricultural university in the country. It is dedicated to agriculture related research, extension and education.
The University has 11 constituent colleges. The University has separate wings for research, extension services and planning, monitoring & evaluation, etc.

Campuses
OUAT has four academic campuses across Odisha. One at Bhubaneswar, one at Chiplima, Sambalpur, one at Rangeilunda, Brahmapur, Odisha and a new one (made in 2009) in Bhawanipatna.  The main academic and administrative unit is at the heart of Bhubaneswar (Latitude : 20° 15'N, Longitude : 85° 52' E), the capital city of Odisha.

Education
The university aims to provide quality education in agricultural science and technology. The university offers the following degrees: B.Sc. (agriculture), M.Sc. (agriculture), B.Sc. (forestry), B.V.Sc. & A.H., M.V.Sc., B.Tech., M.Tech., B.Sc. (Home.Sc.), B.F.Sc., M.F.Sc.,+2 Science, B.Sc. (Pass & Hons), MBA (Agribusiness Management), MCA., M.Sc. (Microbiology), M.Sc. (Bioinformatics), M.Sc. (Mathematics, Physics, Chemistry, Botany and Zoology) and Ph.D. in some of the selected branches such as Ph.D. in Mathematics, Physics, Zoology, Botany and Microbiology.

At the pace of the decades, the University has grown with eight colleges and one Centre for Post-Graduate studies with an annual intake capacity of 1342 students. The latest college was the College of Horticulture in Chipilima. A ninth college is scheduled to open in Bhawanipatna in 2010. The colleges are:

College of Agriculture, Bhubaneswar
College of Agriculture, Chiplima, Sambalpur
College of Agriculture, Bhawanipatna (started in 2009)
College of Forestry, Bhubaneswar (started in 2010)
College of Horticulture, Chipilima, Sambalpur
College of Veterinary Science & Animal Husbandry, Bhubaneswar
College of Agricultural Engineering & Technology (CAET), Bhubaneswar
College of Fisheries, Rangeilunda, Brahmapur
College of Basic Science and Humanities Bhubaneswar
College of Home Science, Bhubaneswar
Center for Post-Graduate Studies, Bhubaneswar
(College of Engineering and Technology, Bhubaneswar was a constituent college from 1981–2002, now it has moved out as a constituent college of Biju Patnaik University of Technology)

Efforts were successful to upgrade the Department of Forestry to a College of Forestry in Bhubaneswar and this change was done on 8 June 2010.

The University has become the Alumnae of 12,934 graduates, 3,883 post-graduates and 213 Ph.Ds. in Agriculture and allied disciplines by the end of 2005–06. Thus, the University could meet the bulk need of the trained manpower of the State in agriculture and allied sectors.

Vice-Chancellors 
The University has made steady progress under the able guidance of: 
   Mr. M.C. Pradhan (29.9.62 to 28.9.65)
   Dr. K. Ramiah (1.11.65 to 15.3.68)
   Dr. B.Samantarai (16.3.68 to 5.6.71)
   Dr. Ch. N. Nanda (6.6.71 to 16.7.73)
   Sri J.Das( 17.7.73 to 14.10.76)
   Dr. K., Kanungo (15.10.76 to 31.7.81)
   Dr. Baidyanath Misra (1.8.81 to 28.3.85)
   Sri K. Rammurthy (5.4.85 to 22.4.88)
   Dr. N. Pattnaik (24.4.88 to 4.2.92)
   Dr. I.C. Mahapatra (5.2.92 to 17.8.94)
   Dr. K. Pradhan (5.9.94 to 5.9.97)
   Mr. R.K. Bhujabala (8.10.97 to 31.10.2000)
   Mr. Sahadev Sahoo (1.11.2000 to 31.10.2003)
   Dr. B.Senapati (12.12.2003 to 18.12.2006)
   Prof. D.P Ray (18.12.2006 to 17.12.2012)
   Prof.M.Kar (17.03.2013 to 28.03.2016)
   Prof S. Pasupalak (28.03.2016 to 21.03.2019) 
   Dr. Pawan Kumar Agrawal (14.05.2019 - Present)

Research and extension

The University has strengthened its research and extension base by establishing eight Zonal Research Stations, four Zonal Sub-stations, 7 Commodity Research Stations and 13 Adaptive Research Stations spread over the state/ along with 48 All India Coordinated Research Projects. Also, more than 41 National Agricultural Technology Projects are in operation. A number of ad-hoc projects funded by different external agencies are also implemented in the University. Some of the eminent faculties such as Dr Biswaranjan Paital, Dr Himansu Sekhar Sahoo, Prof. Gyana Ranjan Rout have made the University proud by publishing their research in very high impact factor (IF 6-18) Journals. 

The University has a separate Directorate of Extension Education which refines technologies and disseminates knowledge to the farming community through a network of 31 KVKs in all Districts of Odisha under different agro-climatic zones. It also provides feedback to the research system for finding a solution to the farmer's problems. Transfer of knowledge programmes are carried out through Krishi Vigyan Kendras (KVKs),  University Extension Block Programme (UEBP), Information and Communication wing, Distance Education, Video Project, Agricultural Technology Information Centre (ATIC), Kissan Call Centre (KCC) and Odisha Gender Resources Centre (OGRC).

References

External links
 

 Department of Higher Education, Odisha
 Agricultural universities and colleges in Odisha
 Universities in Bhubaneswar
 Educational institutions established in 1962
1962 establishments in Orissa